The Giesy–Failing House is a house located southwest Portland, Oregon listed on the National Register of Historic Places.  It is located in the Southwest Hills neighborhood.

See also
 National Register of Historic Places listings in Southwest Portland, Oregon

References

Further reading

1921 establishments in Oregon
Arts and Crafts architecture in Oregon
Houses completed in 1921
Houses on the National Register of Historic Places in Portland, Oregon
Portland Historic Landmarks
Southwest Hills, Portland, Oregon